Diary of a Sinner: 1st Entry is the debut album by rapper Petey Pablo, released in 2001. The album debuted at No. 25 on the Billboard 200 chart with first-week sales of over 100,000 copies in the US and was certified Gold by the RIAA. It was nominated for  Best Rap Album at the 45th Annual Grammy Awards, but lost to Eminem's album The Eminem Show.

The lead single, "Raise Up", made it to No. 25 on the Hot 100. There is a remix called "Raise Up [All Cities remix]" which is similar to the original, starting off with North Carolina, except that he shouts out other cities such as New Orleans, Las Vegas, New York City, Los Angeles, etc.

Track listing
Credits adapted from the album's liner notes.

Notes
 signifies a co-producer

Sample credits
 "Live Debaco" contains a sample from "You Just Don't Care", written by José Areas, David Brown, Michael Carabello, Gregg Rolie, Carlos Santana, and Michael Shrieve, as performed by Santana.
 "Fool For Love" contains a sample from "A Trip to the Stars", written by Lance Quinn and Brad Baker, as performed by Jimmy Ponder.
 "Test of My Faith" contains a sample from "You and Me (We Can Make It Last)", written by Louise Bishop and Bunny Sigler, as performed by The O'Jays.
 "Raise Up" contains a sample from "Enta Omri" by Hossam Ramzy.

Charts

Weekly charts

Year-end charts

References

2001 debut albums
Petey Pablo albums
Jive Records albums
Albums produced by Timbaland